Muhannad Al-Qaydhi (born 26 May 1998) is a Saudi Arabian professional footballer who plays as a centre-back for Pro League side Al-Fayha.

Career
Al-Qaydhi started out his career at hometown club Al-Raed. He was first called up to the first team during the 2016–17 season and was promoted in the 2017–18 season. On 19 August 2019, Al-Qaydhi joined Al-Bukiryah on loan. On 1 October 2020, Al-Qaydhi joined Abha on a free transfer. He made his debut for Abha on 12 August 2021 in the league match against Al-Shabab. On 2 August 2022, Al-Qaydhi joined Al-Fayha on a two-year deal.

References

External links
 
 

Living people
1998 births
People from Buraidah
Association football defenders
Saudi Arabian footballers
Al-Raed FC players
Al-Bukayriyah FC players
Abha Club players
Al-Fayha FC players
Saudi First Division League players
Saudi Professional League players